The Third Alibi is a 1961 British thriller film directed by Montgomery Tully and starring Laurence Payne, Patricia Dainton, Jane Griffiths and Edward Underdown.

Plot
Musicals composer Norman Martell (Laurence Payne) is having an affair with his wife Helen's (Patricia Dainton) divorced half sister, Peggy (Jane Griffiths). Peggy repeatedly asks him to obtain a divorce and marry her; he finally agrees when she becomes pregnant. His wife refuses his request out of sibling rivalry, saying that their parents had always made her give way to Peggy's demands, but she would not give in to her this time. She suggests that the child's father may be someone else. Martell cannot just leave his wife, as she manages his royalty income. Instead, he plots her murder with Peggy, intending to use the tape recorder he uses in his composing to establish an alibi. Helen, however, has decided to allow the divorce, and goes to tell her sister, but when she goes to Peggy's house, she overhears their plans, and uses them to devise a murder plan herself.

Cast
 Laurence Payne as Norman Martell
 Patricia Dainton as Helen Martell
 Jane Griffiths as Peggy Hill
 Edward Underdown as Doctor Murdoch
 John Arnatt as Superintendent Ross
 Humphrey Lestocq as Producer
 Lucy Griffiths as Miss Potter
 Cleo Laine as Singer
 Arthur Hewlett as Marshall
 Annette Kerr as Cinema cashier
 Dudley Moore as Piano accompanist (uncredited)

Critical reception
TV Guide gave the film two out of four stars, calling it a "tight little thriller"; and BFI Screenonline wrote, "The Third Alibi benefits distinctly from the assured economy of his (Tully's) direction. Compact, low-key, but exciting...this later work is, characteristically, constructed with precision; and moves smoothly and swiftly towards an effective and ingenious denouement."

References

External links

1961 films
Adultery in films
British thriller films
Films about composers
Films directed by Montgomery Tully
1960s thriller films
Uxoricide in fiction
Films with screenplays by Pip and Jane Baker
1960s English-language films
1960s British films